The Best of John Denver may refer to the following albums by American singer-songwriter John Denver:

 John Denver's Greatest Hits (also released as "The Best of John Denver"), a 1973 compilation
 The Very Best of John Denver, a 1994 compilation